Nanette Burstein (born May 23, 1970) is an American film and television director. Burstein has produced, directed, and co-directed several documentaries including the Academy Award nominated and Sundance Special Jury Prize winning film On the Ropes.

Life and career
Burstein studied film at NYU's Tisch School of the Arts.

In 1997 she collaborated on her first film with Brett Morgen, producing and directing On the Ropes, a low-budget documentary that follows the fates of three young boxers and their trainer. The film, shot mainly on BetaSP, was nominated for an Oscar for Best Documentary (feature length), won Special Jury Prize for Documentary at Sundance, won the Directors Guild of America's award for Outstanding Directorial Achievement in Documentary. The film also won the International Documentary Association's Feature Documentary award, a Silver Spire at the San Francisco International Film Festival, the Urbanworld Film Festival Best Documentary, and the Land Grant Award at the Taos Talking Picture Festival. The film was also nominated for an Independent Spirit Award (“Truer than Fiction” award).

In 1998 with Nancy Tong she co-wrote the script for Tong's matter-of-fact documentary In the Name of the Emperor of the massacre of over 300,000 Chinese civilians by the Japanese in the Rape of Nanjing in 1937.

In 2002 she and Morgen teamed up again for the Robert Evans biography The Kid Stays in the Picture. The film was very positively reviewed and won the International Press Academy and Boston Society of Film Critics award for Best Documentary. It was also nominated for Best Documentary by the Chicago, Online, Phoenix and Broadcast Film Critics.

In 2004, she produced a documentary television show Film School for IFC with Jordan Roberts, following four film students at their alma mater, Tisch. In 2007 Burstein was executive producer and writer on the VH1 Rock Doc NY77: The Coolest Year In Hell which showcases the rise of hip hop, punk, disco, and graffiti in New York City in 1977. She also executive produced the doc American Shopper.

Her documentary American Teen was nominated for the Grand Jury Prize for Documentary at the 2008 Sundance Film Festival. For the project, she lived in the small town of Warsaw, Indiana for 10 months, filming daily. She ended up with 1000 hours of footage, which took a year to edit.

Nanette is the mother of one daughter.  She lives in New York and co-owned a Manhattan bar, The Half-King, with Scott Anderson, and Sebastian Junger.

Filmography

 On the Ropes (1999)
 Say It Loud: A Celebration of Black Music in America (2001, TV mini-series)
 The Kid Stays in the Picture (2002)
 Film School (2004,TV series)
 Autobiography (2005, TV series)
 American Shopper  (2007)
 NY77: The Coolest Year in Hell (2007, TV series)
 American Teen (2008)
 Going the Distance (2010)
 New Girl (2012)
 Don't Trust the B---- in Apartment 23 (2012)
 The Price of Gold (2014)
 Gringo: The Dangerous Life of John McAfee (2016)
 Hillary (2020)
 Killer Sally (2022)

References

External links
 
 Interview with Burstein about the Film School project
 Indiewire Interview with Burstein and Morgen about The Kid Stays in the Picture
 eFilmCritic.com interview with Nanette Burstein and Jordan Roberts about 'American Teen.'
 Nanette Burstein's Guest DJ Set on KCRW KCRW Guest DJ Set

1970 births
Film directors from New York (state)
20th-century American Jews
Living people
Artists from Buffalo, New York
Tisch School of the Arts alumni
American documentary filmmakers
Directors Guild of America Award winners
American women documentary filmmakers
21st-century American Jews